Timothy M. Harden (born January 27, 1974) is an American former athlete who competed mainly in the 100 metres. Harden was born in Kansas City, Missouri, where he graduated from Northeast High School in 1992. He also attended the University of Kentucky. He is also the 2001 indoor world champion and 1999 world indoor silver medallist behind Maurice Greene.

He competed for the United States in the 1996 Summer Olympics held in Atlanta, United States in the 4 × 100 metre relay where he won the silver medal with his teammates Jon Drummond, Michael Marsh and Dennis Mitchell. He also competed in the 60 m sprint with a personal best of 6.43, which ranks him 7th all-time.

External links
 Tim Harden at USATF
 
 
 

American male sprinters
Olympic silver medalists for the United States in track and field
Athletes (track and field) at the 1996 Summer Olympics
Living people
1974 births
Track and field athletes from Kansas City, Missouri
Athletes (track and field) at the 1999 Pan American Games
Medalists at the 1996 Summer Olympics
World Athletics Indoor Championships winners
World Athletics Indoor Championships medalists
Goodwill Games medalists in athletics
USA Outdoor Track and Field Championships winners
USA Indoor Track and Field Championships winners
Competitors at the 1998 Goodwill Games
Pan American Games track and field athletes for the United States